The Buntine Highway is a 581-kilometre highway in the Northern Territory and Western Australia. It runs from the Victoria Highway via Top Springs and Kalkarindji and then to Nicholson, Western Australia. The section from the Victoria Highway to Kalkaringi is a single-lane sealed road with a few dual-lane sections; the remaining section is unsealed. Funding for maintenance is provided by the Northern Territory government.
 
The highway was named in 1996 after Noel Buntine who established a livestock transportation business known as Buntine Roadways in the 1950s in northern Australia.

Upgrades
The Northern Australia Roads Program announced in 2016 included the following project for the Buntine Highway.

Road upgrading
The project for pavement strengthening, widening and sealing on priority sections is to be complete in mid 2022 at a total cost of $48.1 million.

Major intersections

The only major intersection on this road is with the Buchanan Highway (National Route 80) at Top Springs.

See also

 Highways in Australia
 List of highways in the Northern Territory
 List of highways in Western Australia

References

Highways in Australia
Highways in the Northern Territory